Catogenus is a genus of beetles in the family Passandridae.

Species
 Catogenus acutangulus Reitter
 Catogenus asper Slipinski
 Catogenus castaneus Perty
 Catogenus cayman Slipinski
 Catogenus collaris Sharp
 Catogenus cylindricollis Lacordaire
 Catogenus darlingtoni Slipinski
 Catogenus decoratus Grouvelle
 Catogenus depressus Slipinski
 Catogenus gracilicornis Slipinski
 Catogenus grouvellei Slipinski
 Catogenus lebasii Grouvelle
 Catogenus longicornis Grouvelle
 Catogenus planus Reitter
 Catogenus rufus Fabricius
 Catogenus slipinskii Thomas
 Catogenus temacensis Sharp
 Catogenus thomasi Slipinski

References

Passandridae